In economics, market clearing is the process by which, in an economic market, the supply of whatever is traded is equated to the demand so that there is no excess supply or demand. The new classical economics assumes that in any given market, assuming that all buyers and sellers have access to information and that there is no "friction" impeding price changes, prices always adjust up or down to ensure market clearing.

Mechanism and examples
A market-clearing price is the price of a good or service at which quantity supplied is equal to quantity demanded, also called the equilibrium price. The theory claims that markets tend to move toward this price. For a one-time sale of goods, supply is fixed, so the market-clearing price is simply the maximum price at which all items can be sold. For a market where goods are produced and sold on an ongoing basis, the theory predicts that the market will move toward a price where the quantity supplied in a broad time period will equal the quantity demanded. This might be measured over a period like a week, month, or year to smooth out irregularities caused by manufacturing in batches and delivery schedules; sellers often have a buffer of inventory so that products are always available for retail sale.

The market is cleared when the price brings demand and supply into balance, allowing anyone to purchase or sell whatever they want at that price. A market clearing occurs when supply and demand are equal. By definition, there must be a shortage or surplus if the market does not clear. A shortage refers to buyers wanting to acquire something but being unable to do so at current prices, while a surplus refers to excess product beyond the amount that buyers will acquire at current prices.

New classical economics does not assume perfect information in the short-run, but markets may approach efficient outcomes as information is discovered.

If the sale price is higher than the market-clearing price, then supply will exceed demand, and a surplus inventory will build up over the long run. If the sale price is lower than the market-clearing price, then demand will exceed supply, and in the long run, shortages will result, where buyers sometimes find no products for sale at any price.

The first version of the market-clearing theory assumes that the price adjustment process occurs instantaneously. For example, if a community is subject to an earthquake that destroys all of the houses and apartments, its members will have a sudden increased demand for new housing. Immediately after the disaster, the market for housing in the community will be temporarily out of equilibrium, suffering from an excess demand for houses and apartments (shortage). But if markets are free to operate (i.e. if prices are free to change), and given enough time, prices will increase, causing (1) construction companies to build new houses in the short run and (2) new companies to enter the house and apartment-construction market in the longer run. This increase in production brings supply into balance with the new demand. The adjustment mechanism has cleared the shortage from the market and established a new equilibrium. A similar mechanism is believed to operate when there is a market surplus (glut), where prices fall until all the excess supply is sold. An example of excess supply is Christmas decorations that are still in stores several days after Christmas; the stores that still have boxes of decorations view these products as excess supply, so prices are discounted until shoppers buy all the decorations (to keep them until next Christmas).

History and non-ideal behavior

For 150 years (from approximately 1785 to 1935), the vast majority of economists took the smooth operation of this market-clearing mechanism as inevitable and inviolable, based largely on belief in Say's law. But the Great Depression of the 1930s caused many economists, including John Maynard Keynes, to doubt their classical faith. If markets were supposed to clear, how could ruinously high rates of unemployment persist for so many painful years? Was the market mechanism not supposed to eliminate such surpluses? In one interpretation, Keynes identified imperfections in the adjustment mechanism that, if present, could introduce rigidities and make prices sticky. In another interpretation, price adjustment could make matters worse, causing what Irving Fisher called "debt deflation". Not all economists accept these theories. They attribute what appears to be imperfect clearing to factors like labor unions or government policy, thereby exonerating the clearing mechanism.

Most economists see the assumption of continuous market clearing as not very realistic. However, many see the assumption of flexible prices as useful in the long-run analysis since prices are not stuck forever: market-clearing models describe the equilibrium towards which the economy gravitates. Therefore, many macroeconomists feel that price flexibility is a good assumption for studying long-run issues, such as growth in real GDP. Other economists argue that price adjustment may take so much time that the process of equilibration may change the underlying conditions that determine long-run equilibrium. That is, there may be path dependence, as when a long depression changes the nature of the "full employment" period that follows. 

In the short run (and possibly in the long run), markets may find a temporary equilibrium at a price and quantity that does not correspond with the long-term market-clearing equilibrium. For example, in the theory of "efficiency wages", a labor market can be in equilibrium above the market-clearing wage since each employer has the incentive to pay wages above market-clearing to motivate their employees on the job. In this case, equilibrium wages (where there is no endogenous tendency for wages to change) would not be the same as market-clearing wages (where there is no classical unemployment).

Flexibility in market clearing
Both labor market wages and product market prices are fully flexible and can change rapidly based on supply and demand. Because of this flexibility, there will be no oversupply in both the product and labor markets. If there is an oversupply of a product, prices fall until the price of the item falls enough that buyers are willing to buy it; if there is a surplus of labor, wages fall until employers are willing to provide jobs for all the unemployed who want to work. Therefore, every market is in or tends to be in general equilibrium, i.e. equal supply and demand. For example, electronics retailers will sell old cell phones, computers, and other electronics at low prices. Through this method, the old products are sold faster and the warehouse is cleared to achieve equilibrium. Price flexibility allows previously "disappointed" buyers to purchase the product to achieve equilibrium.

See also
 Double auction
 Economic equilibrium
 Supply and demand

References

Sources 
 "Market Clearing" in International Encyclopedia of the Social Sciences. Retrieved April 25, 2022 from Encyclopedia.com: https://www.encyclopedia.com/social-sciences/applied-and-social-sciences-magazines/market-clearing
 Scholar.harvard.edu. 2022. [online] Available at: <https://scholar.harvard.edu/files/gborjas/files/lechapter4.pdf> [Accessed 2 May 2022].

Financial markets